Mowgli  is a fictional character and the protagonist of Rudyard Kipling's The Jungle Book stories. He is a feral boy from the Pench area in Seoni, Madhya Pradesh, India, who originally appeared in Kipling's short story "In the Rukh" (collected in Many Inventions, 1893) and then became the most prominent character in the collections The Jungle Book and The Second Jungle Book (1894–1895), which also featured stories about other characters.

Name
In the stories, the name Mowgli is said to mean "frog", describing his lack of fur. Kipling later said "Mowgli is a name I made up. It does not mean 'frog' in any language that I know of."

Kipling stated that the first syllable of "Mowgli" should rhyme with "cow." However Disney had the first syllable rhyme with "go." Kipling's daughter got upset about this.

Kipling's Mowgli stories
The Mowgli stories, including "In the Rukh", were first collected in chronological order in one volume as The Works of Rudyard Kipling Volume VII: The Jungle Book (1907) (Volume VIII of this series contained the non-Mowgli stories from the Jungle Books), and subsequently in All the Mowgli Stories (1933).

"In the Rukh" describes how Gisborne, an English forest ranger in the Pench area in Seoni at the time of the British Raj, discovers a young man named Mowgli, who has extraordinary skills in hunting, tracking, and driving wild animals (with the help of his wolf brothers). He asks him to join the forestry service. Muller, the head of the Department of Woods and Forests of India as well as Gisborne's boss, meets Mowgli, checks his elbows and knees, noting the callouses and scars, and figures Mowgli is not using magic or demons, having seen a similar case in 30 years of service. Muller also invites Mowgli to join the service, to which Mowgli agrees. Later, Gisborne learns the reason for Mowgli's almost superhuman talents; he was raised by a pack of wolves in the jungle (explaining the scars on his elbows and knees from going on all fours). Mowgli marries the daughter of Gisborne's butler, Abdul Gafur. By the end of the story, Mowgli has a son and is back to living with his wolf brothers.

Kipling then proceeded to write the stories of Mowgli's childhood in detail in The Jungle Book. Lost by his parents as a baby in the Indian jungle during a tiger attack, he is adopted by the Wolf Mother, Raksha and Father Wolf, who call him Mowgli (frog) because of his lack of fur and his refusal to sit still. Shere Khan the tiger demands that they give him the baby but the wolves refuse. Mowgli grows up with the pack, hunting with his brother wolves. In the pack, Mowgli learns he is able to stare down any wolf, and his unique ability to remove the painful thorns from the paws of his brothers is deeply appreciated as well.

Bagheera, the black panther, befriends Mowgli because both he and Mowgli have parallel childhood experiences; as Bagheera often mentions, he was "raised in the King's cages at Oodeypore" from a cub, and thus knows the ways of man. Baloo the bear, teacher of wolves, has the thankless task of educating Mowgli in "The Law of the Jungle".

Shere Khan continues to regard Mowgli as fair game, but eventually Mowgli finds a weapon he can use against the tiger – fire. After driving off Shere Khan, Mowgli goes to a human village where he is adopted by Messua and her husband, whose own son Nathoo was also taken by a tiger. It is uncertain if Mowgli is actually the returned Nathoo, although it is stated in "Tiger! Tiger!" that the tiger who carried off Messua's son was similar to the one that attacked Mowgli's parents. Messua would like to believe that her son has returned, however, she herself realises that this is unlikely.

While herding buffalo for the village, Mowgli learns that the tiger is still planning to kill him, so with the aid of two wolves, he traps Shere Khan in a ravine where the buffalo trample him. The tiger dies and Mowgli sets to skin him. After being accused of witchcraft and cast out of the village, Mowgli returns to the jungle with Shere Khan's hide and reunites with his wolf family, but it is mentioned that he later becomes married and goes back to the man village.

In later stories in The Jungle Book'''s sequel, The Second Jungle Book, Mowgli learns that the villagers are planning to kill Messua and her husband for harboring him. He rescues them and sends elephants, water buffaloes, and other animals to trample the village and its fields to the ground. Later, Mowgli finds and then discards an ancient treasure ("The King's Ankus"), not realising it is so valuable that men would kill to own it. With the aid of Kaa the python, he leads the wolves in a war against the dhole ("Red Dog").

Finally, Mowgli stumbles across the village where his adopted human mother (Messua) is now living, which forces him to come to terms with his humanity and decide whether to rejoin his fellow humans in "The Spring Running".

Play adaptations
Rudyard Kipling adapted the Mowgli stories for The Jungle Play in 1899, but the play was never produced on stage. The manuscript was lost for almost a century. It was published in book form in 2000.

Influences upon other works
Only six years after the first publication of The Jungle Book, E. Nesbit's The Wouldbegoods (1899) included a passage in which some children act out a scene from the book.

Mowgli has been cited as a major influence on Edgar Rice Burroughs who created and developed the character Tarzan. Mowgli was also an influence for a number of other "wild boy" characters.

Poul Anderson and Gordon R. Dickson used the Mowgli stories as the basis for their humorous 1957 science fiction short story "Full Pack (Hokas Wild)". This is one of a series featuring a teddy bear-like race called Hokas who enjoy human literature but cannot quite grasp the distinction between fact and fiction. In this story, a group of Hokas get hold of a copy of The Jungle Book and begin to act it out, enlisting the help of a human boy to play Mowgli. The boy's mother, who is a little bemused to see teddy bears trying to act like wolves, tags along to try to keep him (and the Hokas) out of trouble. The situation is complicated by the arrival of three alien diplomats who just happen to resemble a monkey, a tiger and a snake. This story appears in the collection Hokas Pokas! (1998) and is also available online.

Mowgli stories by other writersThe Third Jungle Book (1992) by Pamela Jekel is a collection of new Mowgli stories in a fairly accurate pastiche of Kipling's style.Hunting Mowgli (2001) by Maxim Antinori is a very short novel which describes a fateful meeting between Mowgli and a human hunter.The Jungle Book: Last of the Species (2013) by Mark L Miller is a series of comic books that tells the story of a female Mowgli who unintentionally started a war between animal tribes after killing Shere Khan to avenge the fallen members of the wolf tribe.Mi Hermano Lobo (My Brother Wolf) (2020) by Rafael Jaime is a short self published Mexican memoir written in Spanish in which the author details the deep emotional and physical impact Disney's animated version of Mowgli had during his lonely early childhood years as a symbolic "surrogate twin brother" figure and role model after learning about his real twin brother's death one day after their preterm birth. It also includes an exclusive interview with Diana Santos who voiced the character in the Latin American Spanish dub of the 1967 film.  An audiobook version narrated by the author was uploaded on YouTube on September 21, 2021. It is similar in tone to the 2016 documentary Life, Animated.Feral Dreams: Mowgli and his Mothers (2020) by Stephen Alter is a novel which describes Mowgli's harrowing process in trying to adapt to civilization and his coming of age within the walls of an orphanage located in the Gangetic Plain and run by Miss Cranston, an American missionary who christens him Daniel. At the same time, Mowgli recalls some of his adventures in the jungle prior to his abduction and desperately yearns for his freedom.  In this story Mowgli is raised by an elephant matriarch.

Movies, television and radio
 The 1942 film version starred Sabu as Mowgli.
 Disney's 1967 animated musical film version, where he is voiced by Bruce Reitherman, son of the film's director Wolfgang Reitherman (David Bailey was originally cast in the role, but his voice changed during production, leading Bailey to not fit the "young innocence of Mowgli's character" at which the producers were aiming), and its sequel, The Jungle Book 2 (2003), in which Mowgli is voiced by Haley Joel Osment. On three special animated segments for the VHS releases of the Jungle Cubs (1996-1998) animated TV series, Mowgli is voiced by Tyler Mullen.
 Around the same time – from 1967 to 1971 – five Russian short animated films were made by Soyuzmultfilm, collectively known as Adventures of Mowgli.
 Of all the various adaptations, Chuck Jones's 1977 animated TV short Mowgli's Brothers, adapting the first story in The Jungle Book, may be the one that adheres most closely to the original plot and dialogue.
 There has also been a Japanese animated TV series Jungle Book Shonen Mowgli (where Mowgli is voiced by Urara Takano in the Japanese and Julian Bailey in the English Dub) based on the Mowgli series and the U.S. live-action series Mowgli: The New Adventures of the Jungle Book (where Mowgli is portrayed by Sean Price McConnell).
 There was also a BBC radio adaptation in 1994, starring actress Nisha K. Nayar as Mowgli, Freddie Jones as Baloo and Eartha Kitt as Kaa. It originally aired on BBC Radio 5 (before it became BBC Radio 5 Live and dropped its children's programming). Subsequently, it has been released on audio cassette and has been re-run a number of times on digital radio channel BBC 7 (now BBC Radio 4 Extra).
 Classics Illustrated #83 (1951) contains an adaptation of three Mowgli stories.
 Between 1953 and 1955 Dell Comics featured adaptations of six Mowgli stories in three issues (#487, #582 and #620).
 Some issues of Marvel Fanfare feature adaptations of the Mowgli stories by Gil Kane. These later were collected as an omnibus volume.
 A 1978 live-action sketch titled The Wonderful World of Ernie from Morecambe and Wise which parodied "I Wan'na Be Like You (The Monkey Song)". Danny Rolnick played Mowgli using a full costume, although lip-synching to Bruce Reitherman's original recorded dialogue in the middle of the song.
 A 1994 live-action Disney adaptation titled Rudyard Kipling's The Jungle Book, directed by Stephen Sommers, which starred Jason Scott Lee as Mowgli. He was also played by Sean Naegeli as a young child at the beginning of the story.
 P. Craig Russell's Jungle Book Stories (1997) collects three stories, actually adapted from The Second Jungle Book, which originally appeared between 1985 and 1996.
 A 1997 live-action direct-to-video film The Second Jungle Book: Mowgli & Baloo, which starred Jamie Williams as Mowgli. In this story, the character has no spoken dialogue. 
 In the 1998 live-action Disney adaptation The Jungle Book: Mowgli's Story, he was played by Brandon Baker. Ryan Taylor also plays a younger version of the character at the beginning of the story. Fred Savage narrates the story off-screen as an adult version of the character.
 A 1998 live-action television film titled The Jungle Book: Search for the Lost Treasure, which starred Antonio Baker as Mowgli.
 A 2010 CGI animated TV series made by DQ Entertainment International where Mowgli was voiced by Emma Tate (seasons 1-2) and Sarah Natochenny (season 3).
 A 2016 live action/CGI hybrid remake of Disney's animated version of The Jungle Book directed by Jon Favreau, which starred newcomer Neel Sethi as Mowgli. Kendrick Reyes also played Mowgli as a toddler during a flashback sequence narrated by Kaa the python. In October 2018, Sethi confirmed that he will reprise the role in an upcoming sequel to the film.
 A 2018 live-action adaptation titled Mowgli: Legend of the Jungle, directed by Andy Serkis, which starred Rohan Chand as Mowgli.
 In 1984-85, Jonathan Larson and Seth Goldman wrote an ultimately unproduced musical called Mowgli.Actors who played the character
Mowgli has been played by many actors. In the 1942 film adaptation, Mowgli was played by Sabu Dastagir. In the 1994 film adaptation, he was played by Sean Naegeli as a child, and later throughout the film he was played by Jason Scott Lee. In The Second Jungle Book: Mowgli and Baloo, he was played by Jamie Williams. In The Jungle Book: Mowgli's Story, he was played by Brandon Baker, Ryan Taylor and off-screen by Fred Savage. Mowgli was played by Neel Sethi and by Kendrick Reyes as a toddler in the Disney live-action reimagination, which was released in 3D in April 2016. Mowgli was played by Rohan Chand in the Netflix movie Mowgli: Legend of the Jungle'', released on November 29, 2018.

See also
 Rima, a jungle girl character from a 1904 book and 1959 film

References

External links

In the Rukh: Mowgli's first appearance from Kipling's Many Inventions
The Jungle Book Collection and Wiki: a website demonstrating the variety of merchandise related to the book and film versions of The Jungle Books, now accompanied by a Wiki on the Jungle Books and related subjects

The Jungle Book characters
Adventure film characters
Child characters in animated films
Child characters in literature
Fictional adoptees
Fictional feral children
Fictional Indian people in literature
Literary characters introduced in 1893
Male characters in animation
Male characters in film
Male characters in literature
Orphan characters in literature
Jungle superheroes